CHTT may refer to:

 CHTT-FM, a radio station (103.1 FM) licensed to Victoria, British Columbia, Canada
 Chattem (NASDAQ symbol CHTT)
 Chicago Heights Terminal Transfer Railroad, one of the many reporting marks owned by Union Pacific Railroad